Tuli Tuipulotu (born September 3, 2002) is an American football defensive tackle for the USC Trojans. He was named the Pat Tillman Defensive Player of the Year and a unanimous All-American in 2022.

Early life and high school
Tuipulotu grew up in Hawthorne, California and attended Lawndale High School. He was rated a three-star recruit and committed to play college football at USC over offers from California, Utah, Washington, and Stanford.

College career
As a freshman, Tuipulotu played in all six games with three starts in USC's COVID-19 shortened 2020 season and had 22 tackles with 2.5 tackles for loss of and two sacks. He was named first-team All-Pac-12 Conference after recording 48 tackles, 7.5 tackles for loss, and a team 5.5 sacks. Tuipulotu was named a team captain entering his junior season.

Personal life
Tuipulotu's older brother, Marlon Tuipulotu, also played defensive tackle at USC and currently plays in the National Football League for the Philadelphia Eagles. He is also a cousin of former USC and current San Francisco 49ers defensive back Talanoa Hufanga.

References

External links

USC Trojans bio

Living people
All-American college football players
American football defensive tackles
Players of American football from California
USC Trojans football players
2002 births